Yitskhok Rudashevski (10 December 1927, Vilnius – 1 October 1943) was a young Jewish teenager who lived in the Vilna Ghetto in Lithuania during the 1940s. He wrote a diary from June 1941 to April 1943 which detailed his life and struggles living in the ghetto. He was shot to death in the Ponary massacre during the liquidation of September–October 1943. His diary was discovered by his cousin Sore Voloshin, in 1944. His cousin Voloshin fought the German army and the Soviet Union, later returning to the hideout, and found Yitskhok's diary. The diary was published in 1973 by the Ghetto Fighters' House publisher in Israel.

References

Lithuanian Jews who died in the Holocaust
Vilna Ghetto inmates
Victims of the Ponary massacre
Holocaust diarists
Jewish writers
Jewish children who died in the Holocaust 
Lithuanian people executed by Nazi Germany
Executed Lithuanian people
People executed by Germany by firearm
1927 births
1943 deaths